Chaudhary Muhammad Afzal Sahi (born 1 November 1949) is a member of the Sahi Jat family in Faisalabad and is a Pakistani politician.

He is the son of Chaudhry Nawab Khan Sahi, a famous landlord of Sahianwala. He got his early education from Government High School for Boys, Salarwala and then from Government College. He carried on with his education in Lahore and graduated from University of the Punjab (Lahore) in 1971.

Political career
After completing his education, Sahi stepped into politics in 1973.

District Government Faisalabad 
He served  as Member District Council Faisalabad for three consecutive terms from 1979 to 1991.

Provincial Assembly of Punjab 
In 1985, he participated in the non-party basis Punjab Assembly elections, the first elections to be held during General Zia Ul-Haq's Martial Law regime. Although earlier results indicated that Sahi was defeated by 88 votes, the majority of the population was of the view that the elections were rigged. Mr. Sahi filed an election petition against these results which went in his favour. In February 1988, He was asked to take oath as member of the Provincial Assembly of the Punjab but the then government never allowed him to take oath until the assembly was dissolved on 30 May 1988.

He remained undefeated from his constituency from 1985 till 2008.

He served as a member of the Provincial Assembly of the Punjab in 1985-1988, 1988–90, 1990–93,
1993-96, 1997–99 and 2002-2008. He functioned as Parliamentary Secretary for Forestry, Fisheries and Wildlife during 1990-93 and as Minister for Communications & Works in Punjab during 1997-99. He was elected for the sixth consecutive term as a member of the Provincial Assembly of the Punjab in the Pakistani general election, 2002 and was elected as the Speaker of Provincial Assembly of the Punjab.  He remained in this post from 2002 to 11 April 2008. During this period he also functioned as governor of Punjab several times. His most recent term in the Provincial Assembly was from 29 May 2013 to 31 May 2018.

Family 
Afzal Sahi's elder brother, Lt. Col. (Retd.) Ghulam Rasool Sahi, is also a veteran politician. He served as member of National Assembly from 2002 to 2007. He has returned for his second term as member National Assembly of Pakistan in 2013 after securing 130,300 votes, the highest number of votes in Faisalabad Division.

His son Zafar Zulqarnain Sahi served as member of Provincial Assembly of the Punjab, he was elected from PP-52 in the February 2008 elections. Sahi's younger brother, Maj.General Akram Sahi is serving Pakistan Army as a Major General. Now his son Ch Junaid Afzal Sahi is chairman UC 10 Faisalabad and candidate for Chairman District Council, Faisalabad

References

Pakistan Muslim League (N) politicians
1949 births
Living people
Mayors of Faisalabad
Politicians from Faisalabad
Punjabi people
University of the Punjab alumni